Zales Nelson Ecton (April 1, 1898March 3, 1961) was an American attorney and politician from Montana who represented the state in the United States Senate, serving from 1947 to 1953.

Early life and education
Ecton was born in Weldon, Iowa on April 1, 1898. He moved with his family to Gallatin County, Montana in 1907, when he was nine years old. He attended the Gallatin County public schools. He earned a Bachelor of Science degree in business from Montana State College (later Montana State University) and a Bachelor of Laws from the University of Chicago Law School.

Career 
In 1921, he became a rancher and gained interests in grain and livestock.

Entering politics, Ecton was a member of the Montana House of Representatives from 1933 to 1935 and the Montana Senate from 1936 to 1946. In 1946, he ran for the Montana United States Senate seat which was being vacated by Democrat Burton K. Wheeler, who had lost the Democratic primary.

As part of the Republican takeover of the Senate in 1946, Ecton defeated Democratic state Supreme Court Justice Leif Erickson by a vote of 54% to 46%. He served in the Senate for one term, having been narrowly defeated for reelection in 1952 by U.S. Representative Mike Mansfield, a Democratic college professor and Far Eastern expert.

While in the Senate, Ecton served on the United States Senate Committee on Appropriations, the United States Senate Committee on Energy and Natural Resources, the Committee on the United States Post Office and Civil Service, and the United States Senate Committee on Energy and Natural Resources.

Ecton was the last Republican U.S. senator from Montana until the election in 1988 of Conrad Burns, who served from 1989 to 2007. Currently, Ecton's papers are held by Archives and Special Collections at Montana State University.

Personal life
In 1921, Ecton married Vera Harris. The couple had two children, Eloise and Zales N. Jr.

Ecton resumed his ranching business until his death in Bozeman, Montana on March 3, 1961. He was interred in Sunset Hills Cemetery.

References

Further reading
Zales N. Ecton Papers (1898-1961), Merrill G. Burlingame Special Collections Library, Montana State University Collection website

1898 births
1961 deaths
Ranchers from Montana
Republican Party United States senators from Montana
Republican Party members of the Montana House of Representatives
Republican Party Montana state senators
Montana State University alumni
University of Chicago Law School alumni
People from Decatur County, Iowa
Politicians from Bozeman, Montana
20th-century American politicians